José Roberto Ruiz Esparza (born 16 January 1965) is a Mexican former professional footballer who played as a defender.

Career
He was born in the city of Puebla in the state of Puebla. His debut was on May 8, 1984 in a match against Monterrey (Puebla 5 Monterrey 3 ) he played for his home team Puebla FC for more than 15 years. He also played with clubs as Tigres U.A.N.L. from 1994 to 1995, Necaxa, Atlético Celaya. He is remembered with Puebla FC as the captain that was defending the club's colors for many years.

He is now an active member of the political party Partido Acción Nacional.

References

External links

 

1965 births
Living people
Mexican footballers
Club Puebla players
C.D. Veracruz footballers
Tigres UANL footballers
Club Necaxa footballers
Atlético Celaya footballers
Liga MX players
1991 CONCACAF Gold Cup players
Members of the Chamber of Deputies (Mexico)
National Action Party (Mexico) politicians
New Alliance Party (Mexico) politicians
Association football defenders
Mexican sportsperson-politicians
Deputies of the LIX Legislature of Mexico